Racetrack is a 1933 American pre-Code drama directed by James Cruze and starring Leo Carrillo, Junior Coughlan and Kay Hammond. This film is now considered lost

Plot 
Horse racing bookmaker Joe Tomasso (Leo Carrillo) becomes involved with homeless waif Jackie Curtis (Junior Coughlan) whose mother abandoned him some years before. Tomasso acts as the young boy's unofficial guardian and agrees to allow him to become a jockey with the stipulation that all his races must be honest ones. Jackie's mother Myra shows up and wants them to be a family again. She becomes upset over her son's involvement in the sport of racing. Tomasso deliberately creates a situation to drive a wedge between himself and Jackie so that the youth will return to his mother.

Cast
Leo Carrillo as Joe Tomasso 
Junior Coughlan as Jackie Curtis
Kay Hammond as Myra Curtis
 Lee Moran as Horseface 
 Huntley Gordon as Attorney 
 Wilfred Lucas as Mr. Ryan 
 Joseph W. Girard as Judge

References

External links
 
 
 
 

1933 films
1933 drama films
American black-and-white films
American horse racing films
American drama films
Films directed by James Cruze
1930s English-language films
1930s American films